Frederick William "Fritz" Clausen (April 26, 1869 – February 11, 1960) was a professional baseball pitcher in Major League Baseball who played between 1892 and 1896 for the Louisville Colonels, and Chicago Colts. Clausen batted right-handed and threw left-handed. He was born in New York City.

In a four-season career, Clausen posted a 16–22 record with 134 strikeouts and a 3.58 ERA in 324⅓ innings pitched, including 36 complete games and two shutouts.
 
Clausen died from injuries suffered in an accidental fall in Memphis, Tennessee, at the age of 90.

External links

1869 births
1960 deaths
Major League Baseball pitchers
Baseball players from New York (state)
Louisville Colonels players
Chicago Colts players
19th-century baseball players
Accidental deaths in Tennessee
Accidental deaths from falls
Sterling (minor league baseball) players
Galesburg (minor league baseball) players
Burlington (minor league baseball) players
Ottawa (minor league baseball) players
Milwaukee Brewers (minor league) players
Columbus Reds players
Macon Central City players
Macon Hornets players
Detroit Creams players
Omaha Omahogs players
Montgomery Grays players
Milwaukee Creams players
Richmond Bluebirds players
Norfolk Braves players
Norfolk Jewels players
Reading Actives players
Lancaster Maroons players
New Orleans Pelicans (baseball) players
Flint (minor league baseball) players
Grand Rapids Colts players
Shreveport Giants players